Wardomyces is a genus of seven species of mould fungi in the family Microascaceae. The genus was circumscribed in 1923 by Frederick Tom Brooks and Clifford Gerald Hansford. The generic name honours Harry Marshall Ward, Professor of Botany at Cambridge University. The type species, Wardomyces anomalus, was originally found as a mould growing on rabbit meat kept in cold storage. The most recent addition to the genus is W. moseri, described by Walter Gams in 1995. Found in Colombia, it was discovered growing on a dead petiole of moriche palm (Mauritia flexuosa).

Species
Wardomyces anomalus F.T.Brooks & Hansf. 1923
Wardomyces columbinus (Demelius) Hennebert 1968
Wardomyces humicola Hennebert & G.L.Barron 1962
Wardomyces inflatus (Marchal) Hennebert 1962
Wardomyces moseri W.Gams 1995
Wardomyces ovalis W.Gams 1968
Wardomyces pulvinatus (Marchal) C.H.Dickinson 1964

References

External links

Microascales
Sordariomycetes genera